Diego Calva Hernández (born 16 March 1992) is a Mexican actor best known for starring in the crime drama television series Narcos: Mexico and the period comedy film Babylon (2022). For the latter, he received a nomination for the Golden Globe Award for Best Actor – Motion Picture Musical or Comedy.

Early life and career 
Calva was born on March 16, 1992, in Mexico City. He attended the Centro de Capacitación Cinematográfica and studied directing and screenwriting. During his time in film school, he worked as a caterer, set dresser, boom mic operator, and production assistant. He directed a few short films before fully getting into acting.

He landed his first lead role in 2015 in the independent film I Promise You Anarchy by filmmaker Julio Hernández Cordón, which premiered at the 68th Locarno International Film Festival and screened at the 2015 Toronto International Film Festival. He won Best Lead Actor with his co-star Eduardo Eliseo Martínez at the 2015 Havana Film Festival for his role in this film. In 2021, he joined the cast of the television series Narcos: Mexico, playing Arturo Beltrán Leyva.

In 2022, he played the role of Manny Torres in Damien Chazelle's 2022 film Babylon, co-starring Brad Pitt and Margot Robbie.

Filmography

Film

Television

Awards and nominations

References

External links 

 

Living people
1992 births
Mexican male film actors
Mexican male television actors
21st-century Mexican male actors